The Albatross Guest House is the second studio album by Bright. It came out as a split release CD on Darla Records (catalog #DRL-044) and Ba-Da-Bing! Records (catalog #BING-010) in 1997.

Track listing
All songs written by Bright
"You Need Some Sleep" – 1:39
"Tonal" – 3:25
"Titan" – 3:09
"On Life After Death" – 3:50
"The Glowing Pickpocket" – 2:18
"Forever More or Less" – 3:37
"Quaker" – 1:17
"Takoma" – 2:21
"Teo" – 3:14
"I've Stopped Breathing" – 3:24
"O!" – 1:08
"Last Great Patron" – 4:11
"Transmissions" – 2:35
"Stringing up Lights" – 1:18
"Language of the House" – 4:12
"From Tree to Tree" – 1:39
"Seventy-Four" – 1:19
"Somewhere Away from the City" – 3:17
"Albatross" – 4:34
"Attractor" – 5:18

Personnel
Bright
Mark Dwinell — Guitar, vocals, keyboard, clarinet, bass guitar ("Forever More or Less")
Joe LaBrecque — Drums

Additional musicians
Paul LaBrecque — Bugle
Ian Adams — Guitar
note: LaBrecque, older brother of drummer Joe, is a member of Sunburned Hand of the Man, Adams is from the band Rock City Crimewave

Production
Mark Dwinell — Mixing
Darron Burke — Mixing
Jacques Cohen — Mastering

Additional credits
"Recorded at home in Lowell, Dracut, and Allston, Massachusetts, between 1993 and 1996"
Mixed in Allston and at The Cold Room, Boston
Mastered at The Space, Poughkeepsie, New York
"Many of these songs were originally released on cassette (Eek! Records No.7)"
Layout by Chunklet Graphics Control (Henry Owings)
Nikki Tardiff — Photography
"Thanks to our families, friends, and everyone who has helped and e[n]couraged us"

References

1997 albums
Bright (American band) albums
Ba Da Bing Records albums
Darla Records albums